Frederick Leeds Edridge (1800 - 3 April 1841 Woolwich) was a lieutenant in the Royal Artillery and an amateur artist.

Biography
Edridge was at the Battle of Waterloo in 1815, receiving the Waterloo Medal for his service. In 1820, he joined the Royal Artillery, and was stationed with the Sixth Battalion at Gibraltar between 1830 and 1834. During this stay he painted a series of watercolours, mostly now housed with the Gibraltar Museum.

Soldiering could not have been Edridge's passion in life, for he still held the rank of lieutenant by the time he left Gibraltar in 1834. The garrison there had a good reputation in the eyes of its officers who were mainly of the hunting, shooting and fishing persuasion. Edridge found diversion in his painting, a pastime he seemed to have discovered for himself. His works - mainly watercolours - verged on the naive, but have great charm and document an interesting period in the history of Gibraltar.

Edridge died in Woolwich at the age of 41.

References

1800 births
1841 deaths
19th-century English painters
English male painters
Gibraltarians
19th-century English male artists